Savile Row tailoring is men and women's bespoke tailoring that takes place on Savile Row and neighbouring streets in Mayfair, Central London. In 1846, Henry Poole, credited as being the "Founder of Savile Row", opened an entrance to his tailoring premises at No. 32 Savile Row. The term "bespoke" is understood to have originated in Savile Row when cloth for a suit was said to "be spoken for" by individual customers. The short street has been termed the "golden mile of tailoring", where customers have included Charles III, Winston Churchill, Lord Nelson, Napoleon III, Muhammad Ali Jinnah, Laurence Olivier and Duke Ellington.

In 1969, Nutters of Savile Row modernised the style and approach of the traditional tailors; a modernisation which continued in the 1990s with the arrival of designers including Richard James, Ozwald Boateng and Timothy Everest. With increasing rents the number of tailoring businesses on Savile Row had declined to 19 by 2006. There were also criticisms from Giorgio Armani of falling behind the times. However, since the mid-2000s Savile Row has been enjoying a resurgence. A local online directory in October 2014 listed 44 tailoring and clothing businesses on or near Savile Row.

History

While the first tailors moved onto the street Savile Row in 1806, the origins of its tailoring history can be traced back to the beginning of the 17th century. The story begins with a tailor called Robert Baker (RB), originally from Staplegrove in Somerset, who bought up land to the north west of Charing Cross on the back of money made from the sale of Piccadills, a type of large broad collar. Working from "a poore little shop in ye Strand" RB and his wife Elizabeth started a business which pitched their trade at the rich, among which was Lady Cope. Quoting from a contemporary source: "By ye means of ye Ladie Cope, whose Taylor hee was, [RB] fell into a way of makinge Pickadillys ... for most of the Nobilitie and Gentrie". RB soon had "three score men att worke" and with the opening of a shopping arcade the New Exchange by King James I next door in 1609, business prospered. Indeed, so much so that by 1613, "poore Countrey Taylor" RB had bought land for £50 (now over £12,000), which was then open country, and built himself a comfortable new home near where the Lyric Theatre now stands on Shaftesbury Avenue.

Soon, RB's new residence gained the nickname "Pickadilly Hall" and with other properties being developed by himself on that land, the nearest roadway also acquired the name "Pickadilly", which became modern-day Piccadilly. With his next property development RB bought 22 acres of land nearby on which, in present-day terms, includes Golden Square where many cloth merchants used to reside and several streets in Soho where subcontracting tailors are traditionally based. The plot of land where Savile Row was eventually developed was originally called Ten Acre Close and "was created by the sale on 29 June 1622 of three adjacent parcels of ground, then all in St. Martin's in the Fields, to William Maddox, citizen and merchant tailor of London, by Richard Wilson of King's Lynn, gentleman." Ten-acre close was part of 35 acres bought by WM for £1,450 (now nearly £340,000) of undeveloped land which now covers East Mayfair. This estate was handed down through Maddox's heirs for many generations, until it was passed to the Reverend George Pollen in 1764. As a result of this, the Pollen Estate was founded and still exists to this day, part-owned by Norway's Oil Fund since August 2014.

Tailoring has been associated with Savile Row the area since the 19th century, when Beau Brummell, who epitomised the well-dressed man, patronised the tailors congregated on the Burlington Estate, notably around Cork Street, on which John Levick in 1790 at Number 9 was among the first. As of 1806 there was still not a tailors on Savile Row itself, but such firms as Davies & Son, Adeney & Boutroy, John Levick, Stultz, Meyer, Burghart and Davidson were colonising various surrounding streets including Clifford Street, Cork Street, Conduit Street, Sackville Street and Hanover Street. It is believed that the first tailors to actually work on the Row were Henry Poole and Company in 1846, when they turned the back entrance of their workshops at No. 36 Savile Row into the main entrance to their shop.

The Savile Row Bespoke Association was founded in 2004 to protect and to develop bespoke tailoring as practised in Savile Row and the surrounding streets. Founder members include: Anderson & Sheppard, Dege & Skinner, Gieves & Hawkes and Henry Poole. The member tailors are required to put at least 50 hours of hand labour into each two-piece suit.

In a March 2006 report by the City of Westminster (Department of Planning and City Development), "Bespoke Tailoring in London’s West End", it was estimated that between 6,000 and 7,000 men's suits were made in and around the Savile Row area annually, representing a turnover of approximately £21 million. A Reuters article in February 2013 suggested that the total revenue for the informal group of suitmakers was now estimated to be £30–35 million, with several tailoring houses having over 10% growth in recent years. The Fashion Industry's contribution as a whole to the British economy is an estimated £26 billion a year.

In November 2016, Savile Row became a Special Policy Area within the City of Westminster. This gave Savile Row special planning status to safeguard its character: "Development in the Savile Row Special Policy Area will complement and enhance its role as an international centre of excellence for bespoke tailoring." (For more information, see the section below).

19th century

Henry Poole and Co

Henry Poole & Co are the acknowledged "Founders of Savile Row" and creators of the Dinner Jacket, called a Tuxedo in America. The company has remained a family-run business since their establishment in 1806. They opened first in Brunswick Square, in 1806, originally specialising in military tailoring, with particular merit at the time of the Battle of Waterloo. Their business moved to Savile Row in 1846, following the death of founder James Poole. In 1982, MD Angus Cundey brought the firm back to Savile Row (No. 15), after being in exile on Cork Street since 1961; Poole were forced to move to Cork Street, because the lease at number 32 expired and the unlisted building was demolished.

Gieves and Hawkes

Gieves & Hawkes is a traditional British gentleman's bespoke tailor located at No. 1 Savile Row. The business dates from the late 19th century, and was formed by the merger of two separate businesses, 'Gieves' (founded 1785) and 'Hawkes' (founded 1771). Starting out with roots from two suppliers who focused on the British Army and the Royal Navy, it was the first Savile Row tailor to provide ready-to-wear clothes. There are various Gieves & Hawkes shops and concessions around the UK and in several other countries. It holds a number of Royal Warrants of Appointment, which cover all three British Royal Warrants (Queen Elizabeth II, Prince Philip, Duke of Edinburgh, and Charles, Prince of Wales). However, its current status is in doubt after Trinity, a subsidiary of Ruyi Group, was subject to a winding-up petition for debt in September 2021 and its subsequent purchase by Mike Ashley’s Frasers Group.

Dege and Skinner

Dege & Skinner (pronounced ) is known for its expertise in military as well as civilian clothing. It remains a family-run business and celebrated its 150th anniversary in 2015. Located at No. 10 Savile Row, the firm was founded as J. Dege & Sons, and became a joint venture between the two families when William Skinner Jr. joined the firm in 1916. After the Skinner family took full ownership, the business was renamed Dege & Skinner, reopened by customer Colin Montgomerie. The company is by royal appointment to Her Majesty Queen Elizabeth II, His Majesty the Sultan of Oman and His Majesty the King of Bahrain. TRH Prince William, Duke of Cambridge and Prince Harry, Duke of Sussex can be seen wearing Blues & Royals uniforms made by the company in the National Portrait Gallery.

Tailors Dege & Skinner made two frock coat uniforms worn by Prince Harry and Prince William at the Wedding of Prince Harry and Meghan Markle in May 2018. As well as the two uniforms, four outfits for the page boys were also created, challenging the tailors because of the boys size. Eight weeks' notice was given with very strict secrecy involved.

Davies and Son
Davies and Son is an independent tailors on the West side of Savile Row, having started in Hanover Street in 1803. It moved to its current location in 1986, making it the oldest independent tailors on Savile Row. The brand incorporates a number of other tailoring businesses including: Bostridge and Curties and Watson, Fargerstrom and Hughes, Johns and Pegg, James and James, Wells of Mayfair and Fallan & Harvey. It is now owned by Patrick Murphy, Graham Lawless and Mark Broadfield, with former owner Alan Bennett as chair. Davies & Son held the Royal Warrant as Military Tailors to HRH The Duke of Edinburgh. Other customers have included: Joseph P. Kennedy Sr., Calvin Klein, Prince Michael of Kent, Douglas Fairbanks Jr., Edward Fox, Clark Gable, Benny Goodman, Harry S. Truman and the Duke of Windsor. They have also clothed a large proportion of the crowned heads of Europe.

H. Huntsman and Sons

Huntsman, a 163-year-old business, was taken over by Roubi L'Roubi and Pierre Lagrange in January 2013. L'Roubi is a British-born designer of Sudanese origin who was also a couturier on New Bond Street, while Lagrange is a hedge fund investor from Belgium. Huntsman has its roots in equestrian wear and this is a part of L'Roubi and Lagrange's country lifestyle. L'Roubi explained to London Evening Standard that "rather than just owning the brand, we have a connection." He stated: "British upper-class fashion is about individuality. What we are wearing today is sombre but people wear tweeds and shooting stockings so bright that you’d never wear in the city, and that’s where the character comes out, in the high life." As well as the tailoring business, L'Roubi and Lagrange face challenges at Huntsman, including infrastructure updating. Among the technology being used is an electronic tracer that produces a digital file and a hardcopy- this is for the extensive archive of more than 3000 clients and can be used when ordering ready-to-wear. He stated to Spear's magazine that technology for ready-to-wear is not being used on Savile Row. "The others are afraid of technology. We’re competing with Gucci, Ralph Lauren." However, not all changes were seen as beneficial – L'Roubi left the company in 2015 as losses continued to mount.

Norton and Sons
Norton & Sons was established in the City of Westminster, London in 1821, the firm moving to Savile Row in the middle of the 19th century. In the 1960s Norton's incorporated the Savile Row firm of J. Hoare & E. Tautz. The firm were tailors to Sir Hardy Amies. Since 2005, the business has been run by the fashion designer and creative director Patrick Grant. Grant is also known for his work with media, especially the BBC. He also relaunched the E. Tautz & Sons brand as ready-to-wear clothing, for which Grant was awarded the Menswear designer of 2010 at the British Fashion Awards although the company has since been wound up. Grant stated: "When you walk into our shop you get a sense that you’re walking into a place where people enjoy their work and take great pride in it." Previous clients include Edward VII and Winston Churchill.

Kilgour, French & Stanbury
Founded in 1882 as T & F French in Piccadilly, in 1923 French merged with existing Savile Row tailor A.H. Kilgour to form Kilgour & French. In 1925, Fred and Louis Stanbury joined the firm, and in 1937 the business changed its name to Kilgour, French and Stanbury. In 2003, the business became Kilgour. In 2013, Fung Group acquired Kilgour from JMH Lifestyle and Carlo Brandelli was appointed Creative Director (he was CD between 2003 and 2009). He stated: "The first time I was here [at Kilgour], I contemporised. But this time I'm experimenting with what bespoke can be. Because a suit is still a form of armour, it tells everyone where you are in the hierarchy." Unfortunately, the re-branding exercise overseen by Brandelli has not been commercially successful, and the company went into administration on 27 February 2020. Kilgour however "will continue to operate and will contact customers to make arrangements to fit and deliver clothing in hand and to take orders for new garments", although the property on Savile Row is long vacant and it now appears to be an internet-only business offering read-to-wear clothes only.

20th century

Anderson and Sheppard
In the early 20th Century, tailoring was softened by Frederick Scholte, a Dutchman, when he developed the English drape for the Prince of Wales (later Edward VIII). Scholte's "dress soft" style was developed into the "London cut", the house style of A&S, by Peter Gustav Anderson a protégé of Scholte. The "London cut" is a high, small armhole with a generous upper sleeve that permits the jacket to remain close to the neck while freeing the arm to move with comfort. In 1906, Peter Gustav, also known as Per Anderson, founded A&S at No. 30, Savile Row.

In 2004, A&S' lease at No.30 expired, and the building's landlords wanted to raise its rent. Shortly thereafter, Anda Rowland assumed A&S' daily operations. Rowland, daughter of entrepreneur Tiny Rowland (who had acquired A&S in the late 1970s, and whose family still holds an 80 per cent stake in the business) had been working at Parfums Christian Dior in Paris. After Anda Rowland's mother, Josie, decided to relocate A&S to its current, smaller premises on nearby Old Burlington Street, she appealed to her daughter for assistance in managing the firm. Before Anda's arrival, A&S did not operate a web site or viable computer network, costs were left unrecorded and approximately £500,000 worth of unpaid tailoring bills (money owed to A&S) had accrued. Rowland stated: "We’d been in the old buildings since the 1920s and, like many Savile Row tailors or traditional companies, your image becomes tied … like Harrods, it becomes tied to the building."

Anda Rowland's initial act at A&S was to create an internet presence for the firm. A&S' website is a marketing tool and, says Rowland, "it helps to remind people or reinforces the idea that we have one foot in the past, but, also, one foot very much in today".  Since 2005, A&S' sales have risen exponentially so that, allowing for the hiring of six additional full-time apprentices, for a total of eight. As part of its 2012 revival, A&S opened a haberdashery shop on Clifford Street, at the end of the Row. Previous A&S customers include: Cary Grant, Gary Cooper, Fred Astaire, Pablo Picasso, Bryan Ferry, Manolo Blahnik and Tom Ford. In January 2013, HRH Prince Charles visited A&S. In the 30 years that A&S had tailored his suits and coats, HRH had never actually visited the company's premises. In 2012, A&S' revenues topped £4 million and its annual revenues have increased over 13 percent each year since 2009. A&S manager Colin Heywood stated: "We're doing very well, actually. We've found that business has picked up in the last few years, and we couldn't be busier." However, perhaps with the continued 'casualisation' of business and, more recently, the effect of Covid-19, the business has become less profitable than it might otherwise have been.

Welsh & Jeffries
Welsh & Jeffries has premises at No. 20. It is owned by James Cottrell and includes the tailors Lesley & Roberts. It started in 1917 on the high street of Eton and became an established military tailor. In 1990, H.R.H. the Prince of Wales confirmed Welsh and Jefferies's pedigree when he appointed the firm with his Royal Warrant as sole military tailor. They are an independent company. Owner James Cottrell started as an apprentice at the age of 16 in Kilgour French & Stanbury and trained there for 5 years. He worked there as a coatmaker for 15 years before becoming a cutter at Tommy Nutter, from where he went to Henry Poole for 18 years. He was invited to join Welsh & Jefferies as a partner in January 2007, and in February 2013 took over the business with Yingmei Quan as junior partner. Yingmei Quan won the Golden Shears competition in 2011 which enhanced her reputation as one of the better cutters on Savile Row. Cottrell stated: "Finding your cutting style is a process that improves with your experience throughout the years by looking at people’s figures and trying to get a perfect line and balance for that person."

Chester Barrie
Chester Barrie was established in 1935 by expatriate English tailor Simon Ackerman, who wanted a British brand and tailoring for his New York-based clothing business. Locating its factory in Crewe from 1939, close to the Port of Liverpool and its cloth supplier in Huddersfield, it introduced semi-bespoke and ready-to-wear tailoring to the row. Sold to Austin Reed in 1980, it went into receivership in 2002, which split the factory from the retail operation. Now owned by Prominent Europe, clients have included Cary Grant and Winston Churchill, while both Steve McQueen and Sean Connery wore Chester Barrie in their films. However, in 2020 Prominent Europe decided to close its branded business together with its store on the Row. The premises are now occupied by The Deck, founded by Daisy Knatchbull, a women's made-to-measure tailors that also offers true bespoke clothing.

Hardy Amies
The British fashion house Hardy Amies was founded by English dressmaker Hardy Amies in 1946. Having been managing designer for Lachasse in 1934, and having designed clothes for the British Board of Trade under the government Utility Scheme, Amies bought the bombed out shell of No.14 Savile Row in 1946.

Amies was one of the first European designers to venture into the ready-to-wear market when he teamed up with Hepworths in 1959 to design a range of menswear. In 1961, he made fashion history by staging the first men's ready-to-wear catwalk shows, at the Ritz Hotel in London Amies also undertook design for in-house work wear, which developed from designing special clothes for groups such as the Oxford University Boat Club and London Stock Exchange. Amies also designed costumes for films, including 2001: A Space Odyssey.

Amies is perhaps best known to the British public for his work for Queen Elizabeth II. The association began in 1950, when Amies made several outfits for the then Princess Elizabeth's royal tour to Canada. Although the couture side of the Hardy Amies business was traditionally less financially successful, the award of a Royal warrant of appointment as official dressmaker in 1955 gave his house a degree of respectability and resultant publicity. One of his best known creations is the gown he designed in 1977 for Queen Elizabeth's Silver Jubilee portrait which, he said, was "immortalised on a thousand biscuit tins." Knighted in 1989, Amies held the warrant until 1990, when he gave it up so that younger designers could create for the Queen.

In May 1973, Amies sold the business to Debenhams, who had themselves purchased Hepworths which distributed the Hardy Amies line. Amies purchased the business back in 1981. In May 2001, Amies sold his business to the Luxury Brands Group. He retired at the end of that year, when Moroccan-born designer Jacques Azagury became head of couture. In November 2008, after going into bankruptcy, the Hardy Amies brand was acquired by Fung Capital, the private investment arm of Victor and William Fung, who together control the Li & Fung group, though sadly this was to be a short-lived reprieve and the company re-entered administration in January 2019, with the subsequent sale of the flagship No. 14, Savile Row. The Hardy Amies name is still licensed globally, particularly in Japan.

Nutters of Savile Row
Nutters of Savile Row was opened on Valentine's Day 1969 by Tommy Nutter and Edward Sexton, who had worked together at Donaldson, Williamson & Ward. They were financially backed by British singer Cilla Black and her husband Bobby Willis, managing director of the Beatles' Apple Corps Peter Brown, and lawyer James Vallance-White. Nutters was the first shop on Savile Row to pioneer 'open windows' and had bold displays created by the then unknown Simon Doonan, resulting in the shop helping modernise the perception of Savile Row. Nutters of Savile Row dressed the entire social spectrum from the Duke of Bedford and Lord Montagu, to Mayor of San Francisco Willie Brown, to Mick and Bianca Jagger, Elton John and the Beatles. Their designs included Bianca Jagger's wedding suit and the costumes for the 1989 Batman film including those worn by Jack Nicholson. Tommy Nutter was proudest of the fact that the suits worn by three of the Beatles on the front cover of Abbey Road were made by Nutters. Nutter left the business in 1976 and went to work at Kilgour, leaving Edward Sexton to continue running the business. Nutter died from complications arising from HIV/AIDS on 17 August 1992 at the Cromwell Hospital in London. Edward Sexton continues to work at his premises on Beauchamp Place, Knightsbridge.

Meredith Etherington-Smith wrote: "Nutter was a gentle humorist who had a wide and interesting circle of friends attracted by his enthusiasm, by his gentle, self-mocking personality and his acerbic comments on the vagaries of others, always ending with the expression 'But who am I to talk?'."

Chittleborough & Morgan
Chittleborough & Morgan was formed in 1981 by Joseph Morgan and Roy Chittlebrough. Before opening their own shop, Joseph and Roy were both cutters at Nutters of Savile Row, working with Tommy Nutter and Edward Sexton. They produce only bespoke clothing from their Savile Row premises, there is no ready-to-wear or made-to-measure.

New generation

Modernisation, which had begun in 1969 with Nutters of Savile Row, had slowed by the early 1990s, so Savile Row tailors were "struggling to find relevance with an audience that had grown increasingly disassociated". Three 'New Generation' designers are credited with keeping Savile Row ahead of the times: they were Ozwald Boateng, Timothy Everest (a former apprentice of Nutter's) and Richard James. Having each broken away independently from the Savile Row mould, public relations professional Alison Hargreaves coined the term "New Bespoke Movement" to describe collectively the work of this "new generation" of tailors. Interest reached a peak in 19>97 when the three were featured together in Vanity Fair. The newcomers altered their shop fronts and used marketing and publicity to their advantage. For example, when Richard James (tailor) opened its Savile Row store in 1992, it introduced Saturday opening, something of a revolution to Savile Row at that time. Eight years later in 2000, Richard James (tailor) opened a new shop with large plate glass windows that allowed customers to see inside.

The new generation challenged the traditional Savile Row styling, bringing twists and "a fine sense of colour to bespoke suits." They were seen to "push the envelope of modern suit making and bespoke active wear, creating more contemporary silhouettes with bolder fabrics." Unlike the older establishments, this new generation of tailors set out to garner celebrity clients, disseminate their products via supermarket chains and attract wider national and international custom, raising the profile of their new tailoring style. In 2001 Richard James was awarded the title Menswear Designer of the Year by the British Fashion Council, following that up in 2008 with the Bespoke Designer of the Year award, in recognition of its contribution to British tailoring. Boateng received the French Trophee de la Mode for Best Male Designer in 1996.

Richard James
Richard James was founded in 1992 and was the first of the 'New Establishment' or New Bespoke Movement tailors of Savile Row. James's tailoring has always centred on what has become known as its 'modern classic' style: one or two-button single-breasted suits with slightly longer, more waisted jackets, incorporating deep side vents and a slightly higher armhole to give a slim, definitive silhouette. The overall design philosophy is to produce classic clothing, but push the barriers through experimenting with fabrics and making bold use of colour. Indeed, the British fashion writer and academic Colin McDowell has described James himself as being "the best colourist working in menswear in London today".

Ozwald Boateng
Ozwald Boateng, a pioneer of the new generation, saw himself as both tailor and a designer, coining the term "bespoke couturier". Born in Muswell Hill in 1967 to Ghanaian parents and raised in North London, Boateng started tailoring at age 16, selling his mother's designs on Portobello Road; by twenty three he had set himself up full-time in business. He began making bespoke suits in 1990, and is credited with introducing Savile Row tailoring to a new generation. The first tailor to stage a catwalk show in Paris, Boateng's many clients include Will Smith, Jamie Foxx, Samuel L. Jackson, Dhani Jones, Russell Crowe, Keanu Reeves, and Mick Jagger. LVMH President Bernard Arnault appointed Boateng Creative Director of Menswear at French Fashion house Givenchy in 2004. His first collection was shown in July 2004 in Paris, at Hotel de Ville. Boateng parted with Givenchy after the Spring 2007 collection.

Steed Bespoke Tailors
Steed Bespoke Tailors was established in January 1995 by Edwin DeBoise, whose father and brother are both tailors, and Thomas Mahon. They are based in Savile Row and Cumbria making bespoke and semi bespoke suits with a range of braces, buttons and ties. DeBoise trained at the London College of Fashion, and then apprenticed under Edward Sexton, followed by seven years at Anderson & Sheppard, before founding the company Steed. 2002 was Steed's eighth year in business and one that saw an amicable split with Mahon, who is now with English Cut. In September 2008, Edwin's eldest son Matthew DeBoise joined the company and is learning the trade under his father.

Kent and Haste
John Kent and Terry Haste have worked together, on and off, for over 30 years. John has held the Royal Warrant for many years for the late Duke of Edinburgh, who had followed John from Hawes and Curtis when he left that company to set up on his own. Terry, previously Head Cutter and Managing Director at Huntsman (having originally started his apprenticeship at Anderson and Sheppard), joined John about ten years ago. The two had previously worked together at Hawes and Curtis together with Stephen Lachter, shirtmaker, who still works with them in Sackville Street.

The three have a great deal of experience between them: Terry worked with Tommy Nutter, designing and cutting such garments as the outfits of The Joker in the eponymous film, and then at Huntsman, being responsible for many of their iconic garments including the double-breasted suit worn by Alexander McQueen. The three of them maintain a storied clients’ list, including American film stars and politicians, but are better known for their discretion.

Richard Anderson
Richard Anderson was founded in 2001 by Richard Anderson and Brian Lishak who acquired Strickland & Sons (est. 1780) in 2004. Richard Anderson is author of Bespoke: Savile Row Ripped and Smoothed, his autobiographic account of being an apprentice tailor. Customers have included Mick Jagger, Bryan Ferry and the Black Eyed Peas.

Stowers Bespoke
Stowers Bespoke, established in 2006 by Ray Stowers, former head of bespoke at Gieves & Hawkes for 25 years, was created to reverse the trend in the modern market to mass-produce garments in the far east, with all ready to wear suits, accessories and made to measure suits in England. In 2008, Stowers Bespoke purchased the shop at 13 Savile Row from retiring tailor James Levett.

Cad and the Dandy
Cad and the Dandy was founded in 2008 by former bankers James Sleater and Ian Meiers. Cad and the Dandy initially came to an arrangement with Chittleborough & Morgan to allow appointments in their shop. The company had a turnover of £1.3m in 2010, and was listed by The Guardian in the Couvoisier Future 500 in 2009. Cad and the Dandy launched a new flagship at 13 Savile Row in June 2013. The store is the first on the street to hand weave a cloth before making it up into a fully finished suit. With Britain's bespoke tailoring industry facing an alarming shortage of master tailors, the company established an apprenticeship programme in London with young "would-be tailors" in its three London locations: Savile Row, Birchin Lane and Canary Wharf. In 2013, Cad and the Dandy bought the shoe manufacturer Wildsmith, a 166-year-old business.

Kathryn Sargent
In April 2016, tailor Kathryn Sargent became the first woman to open a tailoring house in Savile Row (although she has since moved back to Brook Street). Among those Sargent has dressed include royalty, actors, politicians and sportsmen. The master tailor, originally from Leeds, spent 15 years at nearby Gieves & Hawkes, rising through the ranks to be head cutter before opening her first store in Brook Street in 2012. She said that it gave a sense of achievement and that it is "just great to have your shop and your garments on display for people to see." William Skinner from Dege & Skinner said: "It's fitting that the first woman to be appointed as a head cutter ... is returning to open a shop of her own." In an interview with Another Magazine in 2012, Sargent said that she wanted to be a skilled worker rather than just a designer and to be able to fit something perfectly.

William Hunt
Manchester-born and former professional footballer William Hunt first opened on Savile Row in 1998, having had shops on the King's Road in Chelsea and in Covent Garden. Former clients include: Cristiano Ronaldo, David Beckham, Gary Neville, Gordon Ramsay and Jonathan Ross. Hunt aims to make "powerful suits for powerful men".

Whitcomb and Shaftesbury
Whitcomb and Shaftesbury (W&S), named after the intersection of two nearby streets, was started in 2004 by two Indian twins Mahesh and Suresh Ramakrishnan on St. George Street, near Savile Row. Both had been working in New York but the brothers spotted "a gap in the market for high quality tailoring and quality advice". The Chennai-born twins were able to lure Head Cutter John McCabe, a Savile Row stalwart having spent over 40 years cutting for the major names on the row. W&S's Savile Row Bespoke line is made in London, but they have another range, the relatively more affordable Classic Bespoke, which, while cut in London, is tailored in Chennai by handpicked craftspeople trained to Savile Row standards. W&S has two units in Chenai staffed by approximately 85 local craftspeople. In 2009 W&S established a new program concentrating on abused and deprived women in rural India, who undergo a rigorous 3-year training and certification programme: over 300 artisans have passed through this. Former clients include Sachin Tendulkar, Mick Jagger, Michael Jackson and Richard Gere. Mahesh stated: "The art of Savile Row is to create a three-dimensional form that drapes the body and shows structure while still being fluid and non-restrictive."

Other companies on Savile Row
Henry Herbert Tailors are based in Lamb's Conduit Passage in the City of London but also use fitting rooms at 9–10 Savile Row. They also offer a home or office visiting service with their Savile Row by scooter service.
Gormley & Gamble were based at Cad and the Dandy, 1st Floor, 13 Savile Row (now based in Maddox Street nearby), and were the first tailors on Savile Row to cater exclusively for women. The Deck, at 32 Savile Row, also caters exclusively for women, though is mainly made-to-measure (in Portugal) rather than full bespoke.

Other tailors include: Kent & Curwen (No. 2); Bernard Weatherill (No. 5 - closed at the same time as Kilgour as had become a subsidiary of that company); Comelie (No. 9–10); Higgins & Brown (No. 9–10); Katherine Maylin (No. 9–10); King & Allen, the cloth merchants Holland & Sherry (No. 9–10); Manning & Manning (No. 9–10); Nooshin, Holland and Sherry (No. 9–10); Paul Jheeta (No. 12); Castle Tailors (No. 12); Steven Hitchcock (No. 13); Martin Nicholls London Ltd. (No. 13); Hidalgo Bros. (No. 13); James Levett (No. 14); Stuart Lamprell (No. 18); Maurice Sedwell (No. 19); Gary Anderson (No. 34/35); Alexandre: owned by British Menswear Brands (No. 39); the Savile Row Company (at No.  40 - mainly ready-to-wear and made-to-measure but also offering bespoke).
The oldest tailors in London, Ede & Ravenscroft, have a premises close by on Burlington Gardens.
Gaziano & Girling (G&G) have become the first shoemakers on Savile Row at number 39. They started G&G in 2006, having been shoemakers in Northamptonshire.
Arthur Sleep (No. 7-8) have opened London's first new shoe factory in over a century, below their Savile Row shop. They are the first to make all their shoes, by hand, on Savile Row, and are famed for their ability to make shoes in under 24 hours as "Savile Row's most technologically advanced maker."
Drake's (No.9) selling clothes "people can and will want to wear for years and years."
Alexandra Wood has a tailoring business at 31 Savile Row. She is among the first female tailors on Savile Row, having worked in tailoring management at Shanghai Tang before setting up in business. She has been named by GQ columnist Tony Parsons as “Tailor of the 21st Century”.

Conduit Street tailors
Established by Austrian tailor Jonathan Meyer at 36 Conduit Street in the late 18th century, Meyer & Mortimer supplied both the Prince regent and his fashion mentor, Beau Brummell, as early as 1800. When the Prince became George IV of the United Kingdom he awarded the company a Royal warrant of appointment which, through Queen Victoria and monarchs since, it still holds today. After Meyer pioneered modern trouser design in the 19th century, he formed a new company with Mortimer in Edinburgh, called the Royal Clan Tartan Warehouse. After being bombed out of its premises during World War II, the company relocated to 6 Sackville Street, before moving round the corner to 40 Piccadilly in 2022.
In the late 1950s, from his premises at No.29 Conduit Street, Anthony Sinclair created a classic, pared down shape, which became known as the Conduit Cut. Sean Connery famously adopted the look in 1962 for the first James Bond film, Dr. No, and continued to wear Sinclair suits for all of his appearances as Bond. Though it is sometimes reported that Ian Fleming and his character James Bond bought suits on Savile Row, there is no evidence for this in the James Bond books, and Fleming's own tailor was Benson, Perry & Whitley, located at 9 Cork Street in Mayfair.
Another Conduit Street tailor, at No. 42, was Cyril Castle, who made the earlier James Bond suits for Roger Moore (later being replaced by Douglas Hayward in Mount Street), and for whom a young Edward Sexton worked. Bernard Weatherill was also here until bombed out in 1939, and over the years many other tailors have been recorded in this street.

Future
As of November 2014, there are only two family-owned tailoring houses left on Savile Row, namely Dege & Skinner and Henry Poole & Co. Managing director of D&S William G. Skinner, when interviewed by The Business of Fashion (BofF) website, stated: "Ready-to-wear has been available on the Row for some time, but recession and a tough economic climate have led some retailers further down the road of ready-to-wear..." Although in recent years the global luxury menswear market has grown at roughly double the pace of luxury womenswear, the tailors of Savile Row face the stark reality that bespoke tailoring is simply not a scalable business.

How different companies compete in the forthcoming years will vary. Starting with the 150-year-old company Dege & Skinner, William Skinner points out the young people involved: the future generation of tailors, serving apprenticeships within the trade. He stated in an interview to The Guardian: "We have invested in the future of the trade, because we are confident about the future of the trade. We have a good business model; we make money and we reinvest it in the company. We are not a museum piece by any means."

Patrick Grant, designer and owner since 2005 of bespoke tailor Norton & Sons and its sister ready-to-wear line E. Tautz, stated to The BofF : "The simple truth is that there are opportunities to sell ready-to-wear clothes thanks to Savile Row’s history." He continued: "Personally as someone who has a business on both sides, I would like to see anything with a Savile Row name on it actually made on Savile Row... If you have got ten thousand suits being made by hand on Savile Row, but you have got a million suits somewhere in a factory in Asia also called Savile Row, I don’t think it can do anything other than hurt the business here."

Henry Poole & Co. are wanting to expand into China. In an interview with CNBC, Simon Cundey, director of Henry Poole & Co, stated: "We've had a number of customers who have ordered in London and want the attention to detail we offer them and we hope that by bringing that option to Beijing we can grow the market there." Henry Poole & Co already has two stores in China through a partnership; however tailors make the framework for the suit in London and send it over to be assembled in a Chinese factory.

Westminster Special Policy Area 2016

In November 2016, Savile Row was given special planning rules within the City of Westminster by the introduction of 'Special Policy Areas'. These new planning rules include four other areas and will "make it far harder for developers and landlords to dilute their distinctive character by allowing "clone" chain stores to force out smaller independent businesses." Mark Henderson of G&H and chairman of Savile Row Bespoke Association is quoted as saying "I’m absolutely delighted. It’s recognition that Savile Row is totally unique."

Westminster policy 'CM2.3: Savile Row Special Policy Area' states: "The Savile Row Special Policy Area (SPA) is home to a historic concentration of bespoke tailoring, with the street name in itself acting as a widely recognised international brand, synonymous with the unique and high quality bespoke and discreet, personal service it offers." It also states: "Encouraging bespoke tailoring uses in the Savile Row SPA will continue to support this cluster of bespoke tailoring activities and the wider bespoke tailoring industry in Westminster and the UK."

Councillor Robert Davis said: "Like a good suit, planning policy should be made to measure." Also: "We are using our powers to protect some of the capital’s most valuable assets and create environments where specialist traders can thrive."

See also

 Suit (clothing)
 Haute couture
 British Fashion Council
 Worshipful Company of Merchant Taylors
 Worshipful Company of Drapers
 Hong Kong tailors

References

Further reading
Savile Row: The Master Tailors of British Bespoke. James Sherwood, Tom Ford. Publisher: Thames & Hudson (11 October 2010). .
Bespoke: Savile Row Ripped and Smoothed. Richard Anderson. Publisher: Pocket Books (3 September 2009). 
The London Cut: Savile Row Bespoke Tailoring. James Sherwood. Publisher: Marsilio (1 April 2007). 
Henry Poole: Founders of Savile Row – The Making of a Legend. Stephen Howarth. Publisher: Bene Factum Publishing (17 February 2003). .
Savile Row: An Illustrated History. Author: Richard Walker. Publisher: Rizzoli Intl Pubns (15 March 1989). .
The Savile Row Cutter. Hormazd Narielwalla. Publisher: Bene Factum Publishing (1 August 2011). .

External links
The Savile Row Bespoke Association The Savile Row Bespoke Association is dedicated to protecting and promoting the practices and traditions of Savile Row tailoring.
 The Prince of Wales visits Savile Row tailor Anderson & Sheppard A 2'26" video on YouTube showing HRH The Prince of Wales visiting Anderson & Sheppard (5 January 2013).
Below the Row A 10'08" video on Vimeo by Glen Travis which takes a rare look at the very special relationship between a coatmaker and his young apprentice at Henry Poole & Co. (2013). As seen on the Savile Row Bespoke website.
 Inside Savile Row: life as a master tailor. A 2'52" video from The Guardian with Edward Sexton, master tailor, and Claire Malcolm, creative director at Hardy Amies, discussing their working life at the British home of tailoring, Savile Row in London (4 February 2013).

.
Tailors
British suit makers
Clothing companies based in London
Culture in London
English fashion
Garment districts
Menswear designers